NOC is an open-source operations support system for telecommunications service providers. It can maintain network inventory, manage virtual circuits, maintain distributed DNS configuration and manage IP address blocks.

NOC Project is mentioned in the Configuration management and backup tools section of the 2019 GEANT SIG-NOC Tools Survey among other tools used by the community.

See also

Comparison of open-source configuration management software
Infrastructure as code (IaC)
Infrastructure as Code Tools

References

 

Python (programming language) software
Network management
Software using the BSD license